Huntingdon Road is a major arterial road linking central Cambridge, England with Junction 14 of the M11 motorway and the A14 northwest from the city centre. The road is designated the A1307, follows the route of the Roman Via Devana, and is named after the town of Huntingdon, northwest of Cambridge.

At the southeastern end, the road links with Histon Road (B1049), Victoria Road (A1134) and Mount Pleasant. It continues as Castle Street, then Magdalene Street over the River Cam and Bridge Street, into the centre of the city.

The University of Cambridge colleges Fitzwilliam College (front entrance on Storey's Way, south off Huntingdon Road), Girton College, and Murray Edwards College (formerly New Hall), are located off the road. Girton College is some distance from central Cambridge as a former women's college, just south of the village of Girton.

Also on the road are:
 Ascension Parish Burial Ground, where many Cambridge academics are buried
 Cambridge Seed Testing Station
 Cambridge Genetics Station
 Trinity Hall Sports Ground
 The National Institute of Agricultural Botany (NIAB)
 Number 173 Huntingdon Road is 'the Kaptiza House', build by Pyotr Kapitsa, the Soviet physicist and Nobel laureate   
 The northern access to Eddington, a new settlement under construction by the University

Gallery

See also 
 Huntingdon, a market town in Cambridgeshire, northwest of Cambridge
 Howes, a former hamlet on Huntingdon Road
 Emma Darwin, (1808-1896), widow of Charles Darwin, wintered at 'The Grove' on Huntingdon Road from 1882
 Francis Darwin, (1848-1925), lived at 'Wychfield' on Huntingdon Road
 Horace Darwin, (1851-1928), lived at 'The Orchard' on Huntingdon Road

References 

Streets in Cambridge
Transport in Cambridge
Roads in Cambridgeshire
Fitzwilliam College, Cambridge
Girton College, Cambridge
Murray Edwards College, Cambridge
Trinity Hall, Cambridge